Rijad Sadiku (born 18 January 2000) is a Bosnian professional footballer who plays as a centre-back for Romanian Liga I club FC Botoșani.

Club career

Sarajevo
Sadiku is a product of Sarajevo's youth academy. On 28 May 2017, he was named as a Sarajevo substitute for the first time in a Bosnian Premier League match against Krupa, but was an unused substitute in that match.

Mouscron
On 30 January 2018, Sadiku joined Belgian First Division A side Mouscron after agreeing to a four-year deal. On 5 May 2019, he made his debut as a professional footballer in a 3–0 home win against Zulte Waregem after being named in the starting line-up.

Mladost Doboj Kakanj
On 21 January 2020, Sadiku joined Mladost Doboj Kakanj after agreeing to a one-and-a-half-year deal. Two days later, he made his debut in a 0–0 away draw against Sloboda Tuzla after being named in the starting line-up.

Zrinjski Mostar
On 5 August 2020, Sadiku left Mladot Doboj Kakanj and joined Zrinjski Mostar, signing a three-year contract. He made his official debut for Zrinjski on 12 September 2020, in a league match against his former club Mladost Doboj Kakanj. Sadiku terminated his contract and left the club on 26 January 2021.

Return to Mladost Doboj Kakanj
In February 2021, Sadiku returned to Mladot Doboj Kakanj. He left the club only four months later in June.

International career
Sadiku represented Bosnia and Herzegovina on all youth levels, he also served as captain of the national under-17 team and is the most capped player in the history of the national under-17 team with 26 caps.

Personal life
Sadiku was born in Sarajevo, Bosnia and Herzegovina, to Kosovan parents from the village Radeše of Dragaš.

Career statistics

Club

References

External links

2000 births
Living people
Footballers from Sarajevo
Bosniaks of Bosnia and Herzegovina
Bosnia and Herzegovina Muslims
Bosnia and Herzegovina people of Albanian descent
Bosnia and Herzegovina people of Kosovan descent
Bosnia and Herzegovina footballers
Bosnia and Herzegovina youth international footballers
Bosnia and Herzegovina under-21 international footballers
Bosnia and Herzegovina expatriate footballers
Bosnia and Herzegovina expatriate sportspeople in Belgium
Bosnia and Herzegovina expatriate sportspeople in Romania
Association football central defenders
Premier League of Bosnia and Herzegovina players
Liga I players
FK Sarajevo players
FK Mladost Doboj Kakanj players
HŠK Zrinjski Mostar players
FK Rudar Prijedor players
Belgian Pro League players
Royal Excel Mouscron players
FC Botoșani players